James Walker was a Scottish professional footballer who made over 180 appearances as an inside forward in the Scottish League for Third Lanark. He took part in the club's off-season tour of South America in 1923. He also played for Dundee United and Queen's Park.

An appearance in the 1920 Home Scots v Anglo-Scots trial match was the closest he came to any international recognition.

Personal life 
Walker's brothers Willie and Frank were also Queen's Park footballers. He served in the Glasgow Highlanders during the First World War and was a school teacher by profession.

Career statistics

References

1893 births
Date of birth missing
Scottish footballers
Footballers from Paisley, Renfrewshire
Scottish Football League players
British Army personnel of World War I
Association football inside forwards
Queen's Park F.C. players
Year of death missing
Glasgow Highlanders soldiers
Military personnel from Paisley, Renfrewshire
Place of death missing
Scottish schoolteachers
Third Lanark A.C. players
Dundee United F.C. players